The Eldridge House is a historic house located at 172 County Street in Taunton, Massachusetts.

Description and history 
It is a -story, wood-framed structure, with a five-bay wide front facade and an unusually broad front-facing gable roof with two levels within it. It was built for a laborer in about 1850 in the Greek Revival style; its form is very rare for southeastern New England, and is more commonly found in northern Worcester County, southern New Hampshire and in the Connecticut River valley.

The house was added to the National Register of Historic Places on July 5, 1984.

See also
National Register of Historic Places listings in Taunton, Massachusetts

References

National Register of Historic Places in Taunton, Massachusetts
Houses in Taunton, Massachusetts
Houses on the National Register of Historic Places in Bristol County, Massachusetts
Greek Revival houses in Massachusetts